Cempi Bay (Indonesian: Teluk Cempi) or Cempi Gulf is a bay which borders the southern part of Dompu Regency of Sumbawa island facing the Indian Ocean.  It is notable  for having a surfing enthusiast spots of Hu'u and Lakey Beach.

Bays of Indonesia
Landforms of Sumbawa
Surfing locations in Indonesia
Landforms of West Nusa Tenggara